The Hollsmidt 222 or HT-1 was a Danish light utility amateur aircraft.

Design and development
The plane was designed by engineer Harald Thyregod in 1958 and built by a farmer Arne Hollænder and Aksel Smidt at Hollænder's farm in Aarre. Therefore, it is known as HT-1 for Harald Thyregod or Hollsmidt for two builders. The idea was to create a light, cheap aircraft, fit to homebuilding, with two engines giving more safety. The engines themselves were converted Volkswagen car engines.

Operational history
The plane was first flown by Harald Thyregod on 24 April 1964. It was used by Arne Hollænder and received a registration OY-FAI. At the end of airworthiness (estimated at 300 hours), in 1978 it was donated to Denmark's "flying" Museum (Dansk Veteranflysamling).

Specifications

References
HT-1 at Dansk Veteranflysamling page and in Danish

1960s Danish civil utility aircraft
Low-wing aircraft
Aircraft first flown in 1964
Twin piston-engined tractor aircraft